The Information Architecture Institute (IA Institute or IAI) was a non-profit volunteer organization dedicated to advancing and promoting information architecture. The organization, originally known as the Asilomar Institute for Information Architecture, was incorporated in November 2002, and was a 501(c)(6) organization. It grew to become one of the world's largest professional groups for web specialists, with over 1200 members in 60 countries, It was dissolved in September 2019 and is no longer a professional board of trade.

The institute broadly defined "information architecture" as:
 The structural design of shared information environments.
 The art and science of organizing and labeling web sites, intranets, online communities and software to support usability and findability.
 An emerging community of practice focused on bringing principles of design and architecture to the digital landscape.

Founding of the Institute 
The Information Architecture Institute was founded in 2001 by Peter Morville, Lou Rosenfeld, Erin Malone, Lisa Chan, Christina Wodtke, Andrew Hinton, Michael Angeles, Jesse James Garrett, Karl Fast, Thomas Vander Wal, Jess McMullin and Todd Wilkens, who met in Asilomar to define and create the organization. The founding board, elected in 2002 consisted of Christina Wodtke, President, Lou Rosenfeld, Treasurer, Victor Lombardi, Secretary, Peter Morville and John Zapolski.
During the first week of the creation of the Institute, 163 charter joined. This number became 400 by August 2003. Thes members came from 26 countries. These first member where of crucial importance to make progress to the IAI first projects:

 AIfIA Translations
 Metrics for IA
 Membership Directory
 Education Curriculum
 F2F, a face-to-face project for IAfIA members meet-up
 Job Board
The Institute at its foundation, with its mission of advance in the field of shared information environments, defined goals for the first year:

 Bring value to practitioners of IA
 Advance in the field of information architecture
 Support these goals by creating sustainable infrastructure & operations

Publications 
The Journal of Information Architecture is an independent initiative of REG-iA, the Research & Education Group in IA. It published papers from 2009 through 2013 and was sponsored by the Information Architecture Institute and by Copenhagen Business School.

Conferences 
The IA Institute had its own IDEA Conference until 2010. In 2018, the IA Institute Board voted to be an executive sponsor  for The IA Conference 2019. </ref>

References

External links
Information Architecture Institute 

International professional associations
501(c)(6) nonprofit organizations